The Roman Catholic Diocese of Saint Joseph at Irkutsk is a diocese located in the city of Irkutsk, which is part of the ecclesiastical province of the Roman Catholic Archdiocese of Mother of God at Moscow in Russia. The Diocese of Irkutsk is the largest geographical Catholic bishopric on earth, covering an area of 9,960,000 km2. The Catholic population of the diocese is estimated to be about 53,000 persons. It has 42 parishes served by about 42 priests. The bishop is Cyryl Klimowicz, a Pole. The diocese is divided into five deaneries: Irkutsk, Krasnoyarsk, Yakutsk, Vladivostok and Magadan.

History
 May 18, 1999: Established as Apostolic Administration of Siberia Orientale from Apostolic Administration of Siberia
 February 11, 2002: Promoted as Diocese of Saint Joseph (located at San Giuseppe an Irkutsk)

Special churches
Former cathedral
Church of the Most Holy Mother of God in Vladivostok, Russia

Episcopal ordinaries
(all Roman Rite)

Apostolic Administrators of Siberia Orientale 
 Jerzy Mazur, SVD (18 May 1999 – 11 February 2002)

Bishops of Saint Joseph at Irkutsk 
 Jerzy Mazur, SVD (11 February 2002 – 17 April 2003)
 Cyryl Klimowicz (17 April 2003 – )

See also
Roman Catholicism in Russia
List of Roman Catholic dioceses in Russia
Immaculate Heart of Mary Cathedral, Irkutsk

Sources
 GCatholic.org
 Catholic Hierarchy

Irkutsk
Christian organizations established in 1999
Roman Catholic dioceses and prelatures established in the 20th century
1999 establishments in Russia